Malmsmead is a hamlet on the border between the English counties of Devon and Somerset. The hamlet is situated in the Doone Valley within the Exmoor National Park.

The border between the counties is along Badgworthy Water, which is crossed by the 17th-century Malmsmead Bridge and an even older adjacent ford. Badgworthy Water is also the boundary between the parishes of Oare (Somerset) and Brendon and Countisbury (Devon).

Malmsmead is both on the route of the Coleridge Way and Samaritans Way South West. Just to the north of the hamlet, Badgworthy Water merges with Oare Water to form the East Lyn River that flows into the sea at Lynmouth.

References

External links

Hamlets in Devon
Hamlets in Somerset
Exmoor